Orachrysops warreni, the Warren's blue, is a butterfly of the family Lycaenidae. It is found in South Africa, where it is only known from one hillside in the Verloren Valei in Mpumalanga.

Its wingspan is 32–36 mm for males and 32–40 mm for females. Adults are on wing from December to January. There is one generation per year.

The larvae feed on Indigofera species.

References

Butterflies described in 1994
Orachrysops